The Bisserov Sisters are a Bulgarian musical trio that performs folk songs mainly from the . They were born in the village of Pirin, Sandanski Municipality, Blagoevgrad Province.

Career
Sisters Lyubimka, Neda and Mitra made their official debut in 1978 at the XI World Festival in Cuba, where they won first prize in the competition.

From 1978 onwards, the Bissarov Sisters began active concert activities in Bulgaria and around the world. Their first album was released in 1978, recorded in the recording studio Balkanton.

In 1980, Lyubimka and Mitra were accepted through a competition at the Philip Kutev State Pedagogical University, personally selected by its founder Philip Kutev.

In 1996, the Bissarov Sisters officially expanded the trio to include their children in stage performances. They made their first official debut as a family band in Copenhagen, Denmark. Then Vera and Rositsa, daughters of Mitra Biserova, joined. Lyubimka's sons - Rosen and Manol - are musicians and actively take part in the concert activities.

In 1998 they were awarded the Silver Lyre by the Union of Bulgarian Musicians and Dancers (Bulgarian initialism "SBMTD") on the occasion of 20 years of the Bisserov Sisters. The Vice President of the Republic of Bulgaria, Todor Kavaldjiev, greeted them with a telegram during their anniversary concert.

In 2003 they also received the Golden Lyre Award from SBMTD on the occasion of 25 years of stage performances.

Notable covers
The song "Zevedi Me Jalino" was covered by Rising Appalachia on their 2012 album, Filthy Dirty South, as "Zevedi Me Lalino."

Selected discography

Collaborations

With family

References

Citations

Works cited

External links

The Bisserov Sisters at Concert Archives

The Bisserov Sisters at World Music Central

Bulgarian folk music groups
People from Sandanski